Spectrum Alternative School is an alternative education middle school of Toronto's Mount Pleasant west district that was established in 1978. Its original teachers included Ellen Dorfman, Brian Taylor, and David Clyne who all came from Deer Park Senior Public school in a program called Spectrum. It was the first alternative school for grade 7 and 8 students. The school was proposed in 1978 but was strongly opposed by the Toronto Area 6 superintendent. Due to intense parental lobbying of the TDSB the school was later created.

Its original ethos was inspired by schools such as the Summerhill school  and was taught in a democratic fashion. The program focused on highly motivated students who wished to work independently.

Original goals of the school included:

-Small group instruction

-Individualized goal-setting and evaluation

-Guest speakers, field trips and community projects

-Art, music and art exhibits

-Mock Parliament and simulations

-Literary and arts magazine

-Community Fund raising

Originally sharing the building with Eglinton PS the school moved to Davisville Public School at 43 Millwood Rd, Toronto in 2011, and as such the school is directed by the same principal. Its current alternative status arises largely from the small and intimate class sizes, which are represented by about 30 students per the two grades. Although Spectrum Alternative is a public school within the TDSB, prospective students must undergo an application process to be admitted.

Spectrum

Four teachers deliver the curriculum, while encouraging close relationships among students, and between students and teachers.  Subjects are delivered in large blocks of time.  Independent studies, special projects and hands-on-learning form much of the curriculum. Over the recent years the school has adopted an art-focus.

External links
 Spectrum Alternative School
 TDSB School Overview

Middle schools in Toronto